Shikaar or Shikar may refer to:

Films
Shikar (1968 film), a 1968 Hindi movie produced and directed by Atma Ram
Shikar (2003 film), starring Shah Rukh Khan
Shikaar (2004 film), starring Raj Babbar
Shikar (2006 film), a 2006 Bengali film
Shikkar, a 2010 film starring Mohanlal
Shikaar
(2000 film), starring Aayesha Julka

Other uses
Shikar (hunting), a form of hunting in colonial India
Shikar, a tala (a rhythm in Hindustani music)

See also
Shikari (disambiguation)